The American Music Award for Favorite Artist – Electronic Dance Music has been awarded since 2012. Years reflect the year during which the awards were presented, for works released in the previous year (until 2003 onward, when awards were handed out on November of the same year). The all-time winner in this category is Marshmello, Calvin Harris with 3 wins. Harris is the most nominated artist with 6 nominations. In 2020, Lady Gaga became the first woman to be nominated and to win this category.

Winners and nominees

2010s

2020s

Category facts

Multiple wins
 4 wins
 Marshmello

 2 wins
 The Chainsmokers
 Calvin Harris

Multiple nominations

 6 nominations
 Calvin Harris

 4 nominations
 Zedd
 The Chainsmokers
 Marshmello

 3 nominations 
 Avicii

 2 nominations
 David Guetta

See also
 American Music Award for Favorite Disco Male Artist (1979)
 American Music Award for Favorite Disco Female Artist (1979)
 American Music Award for Favorite Disco Band/Duo/Group (1979)
 American Music Award for Favorite Disco Album (1979)
 American Music Award for Favorite Disco Song (1979)
 American Music Award for Favorite Dance Artist (1990-1992)
 American Music Award for Favorite Dance Album (1990-1992)
 American Music Award for Favorite Dance New Artist (1990-1992)

References

American Music Awards
Dance music awards
Awards established in 2012